Andrea Cassarà (born 3 January 1984) is an Italian left-handed foil fencer, two-time individual European champion, 2011 individual world champion, and three-time Olympics medalist.

Cassarà won a bronze medal in the individual men's foil event and a gold medal in the team men's foil event at the 2004 Athens Olympic Games, and a gold medal in the team men's foil event at the 2012 London Olympic Games.

Cassarà competed in the 2004 Athens Olympic Games, the 2008 Beijing Olympic Games (as a replacement for suspended world #1 foil fencer Andrea Baldini), the 2012 London Olympic Games, and the 2016 Rio de Janeiro Olympic Games.

Cassarà's medal record at world fencing championships include:

 Bronze medal in the individual men's foil event and gold medal in the team men's foil event at the 2003 World Fencing Championships in Havana, Cuba  
 Silver medal in the team men's foil event at the 2005 World Fencing Championships in Leipzig, Germany  
 Bronze medal in the team men's foil event at the 2006 World Fencing Championships in Turin, Italy  
 Gold medal in the team men's foil event at the 2008 World Fencing Championships in Beijing, China 
 Gold medal in the team men's foil event at the 2009 World Fencing Championships in Antalya, Turkey  
 Silver medal in the team men's foil event at the 2010 World Fencing Championships in Paris, France  
 Gold medal in the individual men's foil event at the 2011 World Fencing Championships in Catania, Italy 
 Gold medal in the team men's foil event at the 2013 World Fencing Championships in Budapest, Hungary  
 Bronze medal in the team men's foil event at the 2014 World Fencing Championships in Kazan, Russia  
 Gold medal in the team men's foil event at the 2015 World Fencing Championships in Moscow, Russia  
 Gold medal in the team men's foil event at the 2017 World Fencing Championships in Leipzig, Germany,  
 Gold medal in the team men's foil event at the 2018 World Fencing Championships in Wuxi, China 
 Bronze medal in the team men's foil event at the 2019 World Fencing Championships in Budapest, Hungary

Cassarà won a gold medal in the individual men's foil event at the 2008 European Fencing Championships in Kyiv, Ukraine, a silver medal in the individual men's foil event at the 2011 European Fencing Championships in Sheffield, United Kingdom, and a gold medal in the individual men's foil event at the 2015 European Fencing Championships in Montreux, Switzerland.

Between 2003 and 2018, Cassarà won 11 FIE Men's Foil Grand Prix titles, in addition to six silver medals and six bronze medals.

Between 2003 and 2020, Cassarà won 17 FIE Men's Foil World Cup titles, in addition to 13 silver medals, and seven bronze medals.

References

External links
 
 
  (archive)
 
 
 

1984 births
Living people
Italian male fencers
Italian foil fencers
Fencers at the 2004 Summer Olympics
Fencers at the 2008 Summer Olympics
Fencers at the 2012 Summer Olympics
Fencers at the 2016 Summer Olympics
Olympic fencers of Italy
Olympic gold medalists for Italy
Olympic bronze medalists for Italy
Olympic medalists in fencing
Sportspeople from the Province of Brescia
Medalists at the 2012 Summer Olympics
Medalists at the 2004 Summer Olympics
Universiade medalists in fencing
Universiade bronze medalists for Italy
Fencers of Centro Sportivo Carabinieri
Medalists at the 2005 Summer Universiade
Fencers at the 2020 Summer Olympics